Charles Francis Adams High School, locally referred to as Clarkston High School or CHS, is a four-year public high school located near downtown Clarkston, Washington. The school has a population of 800-850 students in grades 9–12, with over 100 staff members. CHS's mascot is the mighty Bantam, and the school colors are red, black, and white.

Rivalries
CHS's rivals are the Lewiston Bengals, located across the Snake River in Idaho in the twin city of Lewiston. The rivalry game in football began  in 1906, and was formerly played on Thanksgiving day.

Activities
Clarkston High School offers a variety of sports, clubs and activities for students to participate in throughout the school year. 
Sports offered in the fall include: cross country, football, girls' swim, girls' soccer and volleyball. Winter sports include: boys' basketball, girls' basketball and wrestling. Spring sports include: baseball, softball, tennis, track and boys' soccer.

Awards

Clarkston High School was awarded the 2008 State Superintendent's Learning Improvement Award, along with 97 other elementary, middle, high and alternative schools, out of approximately 2,500 schools in Washington state. Progress was measured by the scores of six years of data from the Washington Assessment of Student Learning, or the WASL.
Clarkston also won the Golden Throne girls' basketball game and spirit competition, but were outplayed by the Bengals during the boys' game where seniors Ben Havens, Greg Pederson, and James Baerlocher lead their team to a win over the Clarkston Bantams. The two school combined raised over $8,000 from the spirit week. Over $5,000 came from CHS. Lewiston Morning Tribune Golden Throne Article

References

External links

 https://web.archive.org/web/20091025125258/http://www.k12.wa.us/Communications/pressreleases2008/SchoolsofDistinction2008.aspx
 https://archive.today/20061203065650/http://schools.csdk12.org/chs/
 https://archive.today/20090922204722/http://schools.csdk12.org/chssports/

Lewiston–Clarkston metropolitan area
High schools in Asotin County, Washington
Public high schools in Washington (state)